Mastixia glauca is a tree in the family Nyssaceae. The specific epithet  is from the Greek meaning "bluish-grey", referring to the colour of the leaf underside.

Description

Distribution and habitat
Mastixia glauca is endemic to Borneo and confined to Malaysia's Sarawak state where it is known only from Mount Santubong. Its habitat is mixed dipterocarp forests at around  altitude.

References

glauca
Endemic flora of Borneo
Trees of Borneo
Flora of Sarawak
Plants described in 1976
Taxonomy articles created by Polbot